Chapalak Cave is a Late Paleolithic site located at the Amarlou region, in the Gilan Province, northern Iran. The cave contains evidence for late Paleolithic human cave occupation. Stone artifacts and animal remains were excavated by an Iranian-Korean team in 2008. They found lithic artifacts (14 pieces: cores and blades/bladelets) in the upper most layer of the test pit that based on their techno-typological characteristics attributed to the Late Paleolithic period.

References

Archaeological sites in Iran
Former populated places in Iran
History of Gilan
Landforms of Gilan Province
Caves of Iran
Upper Paleolithic sites